The Division Bell Mystery is a 1932 political murder mystery by Labour Party MP Ellen Wilkinson. A financier is found shot in the House of Commons. A young parliamentary private secretary turns amateur sleuth becoming smitten by the dead man's gorgeous but enigmatic granddaughter.

References

British political novels
1932 British novels
British crime novels
George G. Harrap and Co. books